Moisi Golemi, also known as Moisi of Dibra, was an Albanian nobleman and a commander of the League of Lezhë. In 1443–44 he captured all Ottoman holdings in the area of Dibër region. For a brief period in the 1450s he joined the Ottomans, but soon abandoned them and returned to the League. He died in 1464, when he was executed publicly in Constantinople after being captured by the Ottoman army. In Albanian folk tradition, Golemi became a popular hero mostly through the Song of Moisi Golemi (Kënga e Moisi Golemit).

Family 
Born in the vicinity of modern Dibra he was the only son of Muzakë Arianiti, son of Komnen Arianiti and brother of Gjergj Arianiti. In 1445 he was married to Zanfina Muzaka after her divorce with Muzakë Thopia, who was married to Skanderbeg's sister Maria. They had two sons and four daughters, two of which died at an early age. His firstborn son Çezar Arianiti (Cesare Comnino Arianiti) had one daughter named Giovanna Comminata, who lived in Naples and was married to patrician Paulo Brancaccio. His second son Aranit Arianiti was married to Gjon Muzaka's sister and had only one daughter Helena who was married to a Venetian commander. One of this daughters, Despina was married to Stanisha II Kastrioti, son of Stanisha I Kastrioti and nephew of Skanderbeg, while his other daughter Helena was first married to Nikollë IV Dukagjini, son of Lekë Dukagjini. After his death she was married to Sinan bey Muzaka.

League of Lezhë 
When Skanderbeg came in Albania, Moisi quickly allied with him and became commander of the border guard. Golemi was first distinguished in the battle of Torvioll in 1444. Later he oversaw the capture of the crucial castle of Svetigrad in modern-day North Macedonia.

After the debacle of the Siege of Berat, and growing envious of the fame Skanderbeg had accumulated over the years, he betrayed his commander in chief and went over to the Ottomans. However, Albanian border troops did not follow him. Instead the command of border troops was passed to Nikolle and Dhimiter Berisha.

One year later he returned at the head of a fifteen thousand men-strong army, but was promptly defeated by Skanderbeg. He retreated first to Macedonia and then to Constantinople, where he was left ignored by the Ottoman authorities. Soon thereafter, he went back to Skanderbeg, who pardoned and reinstated him. He got back the position of a commander of the Albanian border troops.

Moisi devoted the rest of his life to the Albanian struggle, but in 1464 he fell prisoner to Ballaban Badera, an Albanian-born Ottoman sanjakbey of the Sanjak of Ohrid at the Battle of Vaikal. Dispatched hastily to Constantinople along with other Albanian princes and captains, he was skinned alive publicly, in Constantinople.

Domain 
Muzakë Arianiti's domains extended in areas of Mokër and Çermenikë. Gjon Muzaka mentions Librazhd, Qukës, Dorëz, and Gur among others as parts of his personal demesne. Apart from the areas inherited by his father Golemi was acknowledged as lord of Dibra by Skanderbeg as he led the expedition against the Ottomans in that region. Golemi's son Aranit is mentioned in contemporary sources as the lord of a barony in Çermenikë.

Legacy 
In Albanian folk tradition, Golemi became a popular hero mostly through the Song of Moisi Golemi (Kënga e Moisi Golemit), an epic of the Arbëreshë in southern Italy.

See also 
 Musa Kesedžija

Annotations 
His given name is equivalent to Moses. Janus-Jacobus Boissard called him Moises Dibriota (1596).

References 
Notes

Sources

External links 

1460s deaths
Albanian people executed abroad
15th-century executions by the Ottoman Empire
Arianiti family
15th-century Albanian people
Medieval Albanian nobility
People executed by flaying
Year of birth unknown
Albanians in North Macedonia
Albanian military personnel
Albanian Christians
Eastern Orthodox Christians from Albania